The 2015–16 División de Honor was the 49th season of the top flight of the Spanish domestic rugby union competition since its inception in 1953. Regular season began on 19 September 2015 and finished on 1 May 2016.

The playoffs began in May, with the Final taking place on 28 May.

El Salvador won its eighth División de Honor title after defeating local arch-rivals Valladolid in the Final 24–23, held at Estadio Pepe Rojo on 28 May. Pozuelo was the team relegated to División de Honor B de Rugby.

Competition format
The regular season runs through 22 match days. Upon completion the regular season, it is the turn of championship playoffs. The breakdown is as follows;
Teams in 1st & 2nd at regular season standings receive a bye to semifinal.
Teams at 3rd, 4th, 5th & 6th position plays for the two vacant places in quarter-finals.
Team in 11th position plays the relegation playoff.
Team in 12th position is relegated.

Each win means 4 points to winning team.
A draw means 2 points for each team.
1 bonus point for a team that achieves 4 tries in a match.
A defeat by 7 or less points means 1 bonus point for defeated team.

Teams

Results

Table 

</onlyinclude>
<onlyinclude>

Championship playoffs

Bracket

Quarter-finals

Semifinals

Final

Relegation playoff
The relegation playoff was played over two legs by Bizkaia Gernika, the team finishing 11th in División de Honor, and CAU Valencia, the losing team from División de Honor B promotion playoff final. Bizkaia Gernika won 129–25 on aggregate and remained in División de Honor for 2016–17 season.

1st leg

2nd leg

Scorers statistics

Top try scorers

Top points scorers

See also
2015–16 División de Honor B de Rugby
2016 Copa del Rey de Rugby

References

External links
Official site

2015–16
 
Spain